William Nisbet may refer to:

William Nisbet MP (1666–1724), one of the Scottish representatives to the first Parliament of Great Britain
William Nisbet (physician) (1759–1822), Scottish physician
William Hamilton Nisbet (1747–1822), British politician
William Nisbet (mason), Grand Master of the Grand Lodge of Scotland, 1746–1747
William Nisbet of Dean, Scottish merchant who twice served as Provost of Edinburgh

See also
William Nesbit (disambiguation)